Santo Adriano del Monte is one of 28 parishes (administrative divisions) in the municipality of Grado, within the province and autonomous community of Asturias, in northern Spain.

Villages and hamlets
La Condesa 
El Hortigal (L'Ortigal)
Santo Adriano del Monte (San Adrianu)

References

Parishes in Grado